PDQ Food Stores was a chain of convenience stores located in the Wisconsin areas of Milwaukee and Madison, and one California store near Homewood.

The chain began as Tri Dairy Store in 1948 in Middleton, Wisconsin, opened by Sam Jacobsen. Originally the store carried only dairy products, but Jacobsen added other grocery products as time went on, and business improved. The second store didn't come along until 1962; the name PDQ, an acronym for "pretty darn quick" or "pretty damn quick", was a popular catch phrase in the post-World War II era, and the name was suggested by Jacobsen's wife Mary. The original store soon adopted the name as well.

As of January 2016, PDQ Food Stores numbered 34 locations. Most sold gasoline, as is common with modern convenience stores. On May 1, 2009, PDQ Food Stores was sold to the employees and was 100% employee owned.

On July 19, 2017, Kwik Trip Stores signed an agreement to acquire the assets of PDQ Food Stores. The acquisition was completed on October 9, 2017, and Kwik Trip remodeled and re-imaged the existing PDQ locations over the following weeks.

References

External links 
 PDQstores.com, not the chain's web site

Defunct companies based in Wisconsin
Defunct retail companies of the United States
Middleton, Wisconsin
Economy of Milwaukee
Buildings and structures in Placer County, California
Economy of Madison, Wisconsin
Economy of the Midwestern United States
Convenience stores of the United States
1948 establishments in Wisconsin
Retail companies established in 1948
2017 disestablishments in Wisconsin
Retail companies disestablished in 2017
2017 mergers and acquisitions